The United States Othello Association (USOA) is connected with the (trademarked) game of Othello, which is closely connected with the historical game Reversi. The following quote appears in an old issue of its journal, the Othello Quarterly: "Membership in the United States Othello Association (USOA) is available to all residents of the United States. The USOA is a nonprofit corporation dedicated to the advancement of the game of Othello in the United States; its activities include conducting, sponsoring, or sanctioning tournaments, maintaining a national rating system for active players, and publishing instructional materials, including OTHELLO QUARTERLY." At the present time, the USOA continues in this state with all of these functions, with the exception of the currently defunct journal.

In the previous year (2009), only a small number of tournaments directly giving opportunities to play for the United States team at the official world championship (which was last year held in Ghent, Belgium, and generally moves from place to place annually) were held.

References

Game associations
Reversi